Luca Ciarrocca is an Italian Internet entrepreneur, journalist and author of macroeconomic and geopolical books. He is the editor of Wall Street Cina, a news organization focused on geopolitics and markets. In 1999 he became a pioneer launching the internet media company Wall Street Italia, which he managed as Ceo and directed as editor in chief for 15 years, until he sold it in 2014. Two of his books are considered radically critical of the banking and global financial system. In September 2015 he published "Rimetti a noi i nostri debiti" (Guerini) (Forgive Us Our Debt) an essay on public debt which proposes a "QE For The People". In November 2013 "I padroni del mondo" (Chiarelettere) "(Masters of The World – How the Global Finance Elite Decides the Fate of Governments and Populations) quickly became a best seller with 5 printings in few weeks.

Biography
Luca Ciarrocca was born in Rome. His paternal family comes from Santo Stefano di Sessanio, in the province of L'Aquila, Abruzzi. He completed his professional education with a degree in Law at Università La Sapienza, Rome, followed by a Master in Business Administration, with specialty in Finance, from the SAA (Scuola di Amministrazione Aziendale) in Turin.

Career
Luca Ciarrocca chose financial journalism as his career path and landed a post-MBA internship at Mondo Economico, the weekly magazine of Il Sole 24 Ore, his first full-time job. He became a licensed journalist and was nominated senior editor of Il Mondo, a weekly business and political magazine within the RCS-Corriere della Sera Group. Later he was selected to become correspondent in New York and moved to the US. In New York over the course of many years, he worked for several major Italian media outlets, including Il Giornale, ANSA, L'Espresso. He has also written for La Repubblica, Milano Finanza and The Street. He regularly appears as a financial, economic and political pundit on Italian television and radio programs, like RAI, Mediaset, SkyNews, La7 and other media.

Online Financial News
Ciarrocca came up with the idea for Wall Street Italia in New York during the summer of 1999 and the website was launched on 11 October, during the golden season of the "new economy". The offices were on the 73rd floor of the Empire State Building in Manhattan. For a few years about 30% of Wall Street Italia shares were owned by HdpNet, the Internet holding company that belonged to the leading Italian publishing group RCS-Corriere della Sera. Following the withdrawal of Corriere della Sera from the business, as chief executive officer and Editor in Chief, Ciarrocca practiced an unbiased and aggressive approach in the world of online business news. Traffic on the website grew during the years 2008–2011, along with financial crisis. Later more space was given to geopolitics and macro economy. On the morning of 11 September 2001, Luca Ciarrocca was the first in the world to give news of the Al Qaeda terrorist attack on the World Trade Center Towers. Ciarrocca sold Wall Street Italia in October 2014 to an Internet media company listed at the Milan Stock Exchange, choosing to remain independent and pursuing a career as macroeconomic author.

Awards
In 1997 he was awarded the "Premiolino" prize, the oldest and one of the most respected Italian journalistic awards, nominated by ANSA for "having beaten the powerful American news agencies on their own turf". In 2016 Ciarrocca was among the winners of 8th Amerigo/ENAM Journalism Award for the section Websites

Published work
The most recent book is "Terza Guerra Mondiale" (Chiarelettere, 2022) ("Intelligence sources and top secret documents reveal where a nuclear war can start and why Italy is a target"). "L'Affaire Soros" (Chiarelettere, 2019) is a deep investigation on the billionaire philanthropy activist and the vast conspiracy theories spread against him by the antisemitic alt-right. In July 2018 Ciarrocca published "Intervista sulla Cina – Come convivere con la superpotenza globale del futuro" (Gangemi Editore), an economic and geopolitical analysis of the Asian superpower ambitions and its growing strength in dealing with the United States, Russia and Europe. "Rimetti a noi i nostri debiti" (Guerini) (Forgive Us Our Debt) is a 2015 essay on public debt which proposes a "QE For The People" (a new form of Quantitative Easing: central banks should give 'helicopter money' directly to taxpayers, not to commercial banks who are responsible in the first place for the economic and financial crisis). The most important book is considered "I padroni del mondo" (Chiarelettere, 2013) "(Masters of the World – How the Global Finance Elite Decides the Fate of Governments and Populations). A best seller with 5 printings, this essay is radically critical of central banks. It covers the financial crisis and monetary reforms, in particular the proposal by the UK organization Positive Money for fixing the dysfunctional global banking system. Ciarrocca's first book was in 2001 "Investire in tempo di guerra" (Investing in Times of War), Edizioni Nutrimenti.

References

Living people
Italian atheists
Italian newspaper editors
Italian male journalists
Italian magazine editors
Year of birth missing (living people)